Lotus Blossom (aka Lian hua xin chu xi and Daughter of Heaven) is a 1921 film written and directed by Shanghai-born actor James B. Leong and Frank Grandon.

Plot 
The inventor of the first clock — which would eliminate the use of a Chinese village's sacred bell — is sentenced to life imprisonment by the emperor, but he escapes his fate by hiding with a father and his daughter. The story was reportedly based on an ancient Chinese legend.

Cast 

 Lady Tsen Mei as Moy Tai
 Tully Marshall as Quong Foo
 Noah Beery as Tartar Chief
 Yutaka Abe as Quong Sung
 Goro Kino as The Emperor
 James Wang as Professor Lowe Team
 Chow Young as Tsze Sin

Background 
Leong — who later became a prolific character actor in Hollywood — created the Wah Ming Motion Picture Company in 1919 aiming to craft films that would combat Hollywood's stereotypical portrayals of Chinese people as assassins and villains. (Leong had been born in Shanghai but educated in Indiana, and he had been enlisted by a number of Hollywood directors to work as a translator and technical director on film sets in the late 1910s.)

Production 
The film was produced in Los Angeles and was financially backed by the support of Chinese merchants. The cast was largely Chinese, but Leong and co-director Francis J. Grandon did cast two white actors — Tully Marshall and Noah Beery — to play Chinese roles, as was common at that time. The film took around six months to make, and it had a budget of around $100,000. Leong cast Lady Tsen Mei, a Chinese opera singer, in the lead role.

Release 
When the film opened in Los Angeles in 1921, actresses Anna May Wong and Bessie Wong were on hand to greet customers at the door. A Chinese symphony orchestra provided the film's score.

Home media
In 2004, the film was released on DVD by Facets Multimedia Distribution and Image Entertainment.

References 

1921 films
American black-and-white films
Films directed by Francis J. Grandon